Kristiansand Region is a statistical metropolitan region in Agder county in southern Norway. It is centered on the city of Kristiansand. The region consist of six municipalities in the centre of Southern Norway. Vennesla, Iveland, and Birkenes are inland municipalities while Kristiansand, Lindesnes, and Lillesand are coastal municipalities. Kristiansand is the largest municipality in population in the region.

Municipalities
The following municipalities are part of this region:

Geography 
The Kristiansand region lies along the southern coast of Norway, centered around the city of Kristiansand.  The region borders the Lister Region to the west, the region of Setesdal to the northwest (with Evje as the administrative centre), and Østre Agder to the northeast (with Arendal as the administrative centre).

Urban areas

The city of Kristiansand is the main urban area for the Kristiansand region. The borough Kvadraturen is the city downtown centrum and administrative centre for Kristiansand municipality. The borough has a population of 5,750 and is the least populated borough in Kristiansand. Vest-Agder County's government building is also located in Kristiansand.

Other larger urban areas in the region include the village of Vennesla which is the administrative centre of Vennesla municipality, and it has a population of nearly 13,000.  Nodeland is the administrative centre for Songdalen municipality, and it has a population of about 3,500.  Søgne municipality's administrative centre is Tangvall (also referred to as Søgne). Tangvall is located right next to the European route E39 highway.  It has nearly 10,000 residents.  Lillesand municipality's administrative centre is the town of Lillesand which has a population of about 7,500.  Birkeland, the administrative centre of Birkenes municipality, has a population of almost 3,000.

Cities and towns 

Cities and towns in Norway are designated with this special status by the government.  City status in Norway has no special benefits anymore, but historically it did.  Cities and towns in Norway are called .  Other urban areas without that status are called  which roughly translates as village in English.  Kristiansand and Lillesand are the only cities/towns in the region.

Villages and suburbs

Some of the larger villages and suburban areas in the region include Hægeland and Skarpengland in Vennesla; Finsland, Brennåsen, Volleberg, and Nodeland, Vedderheia, Høllen, Åros, and Langenes in Kristiansand; and Engesland, Herefoss, Oggevatn, and Vegusdal in Birkenes.  Lillesand has the village areas of Kroksteinåsen, Borkedalen, and Møglestu.

Kristiansand municipality also has some large suburban areas in some part-boroughs of the boroughs, like in Vågsbygd has larger suburban areas like Voiebyen, Slettheitoppen in Slettheia, Åsane and the island Flekkerøy. Grim has one large suburban area: Hellemyr. Mosby and Strai is smaller suburbs farer away from the city. At Lund, Gimlekollen and Justvik is the larger suburban areas while Gimlevang, Sødal, Hamreheia and Kuholmen is smaller suburbs in the Lund borough. And in Oddernes is Hånes, Søm and Hamresanden, Brattvollshei at Tveit, Tømmerstø, Dvergsnes, Odderhei and Holte at Randesund.

Transportation

Airports 
The only publicly open airport in the region is Kristiansand Airport, Kjevik, it had about 1 million travelers in 2014.

Railroads 
There are three open train stations in the region; Kristiansand Station, Vennesla Station, and Nodeland Station which all operate on the Sørlandsbanen railway. Nodeland Station gets trains from Stavanger Station to Kristiansand which at selective hours continues to Oslo Central Station. Vennesla Station gets train traffic from Oslo to Kristiansand which at selective hours continues to Stavanger.

Roads 

The European route E18 highway is the main road for eastern Kristiansand and Lillesand, it is highway from Kristiansand, through Lillesand towards Arendal. It has four lanes to Grimstad and two lanes from Grimstad to Arendal. E18 continues through Aust-Agder and on to Oslo.  The European route E39 highway is the main road for western Kristiansand, lower Songdalen, and Søgne. It is highway from downtown Kristiansand to Hellemyr, and from Brennåsen in Songdalen, to Tangvall in Søgne. E39 continues through Vest-Agder and on to Stavanger.

Norwegian National Road 9 is a national road from downtown Kristiansand through Vennesla municipality and the villages of Øvrebø and Hægeland. The road continues north to Evje and the Setesdalen valley.  Norwegian National Road 41 is a national road from Timeneskrysset in Kristiansand through Tveit and on through the municipality Birkenes.

Norwegian County Road 461 is the main road from E39 to Nodeland and through Songdalen municipality. Norwegian County Road 405 is the main road from R9 to the town Vennesla. Norwegian County Road 454 is the main road from R9 to Øvrebø. Norwegian National Road 456 is the main road from E39 through Tangvall and Langenes in Søgne, it continues through the borough of Vågsbygd and ends with a highway tunnel from Vågsbygd to Hannevika where it meets E39 again. Norwegian County Road 402 goes from E18 in Lillesand to Birkeland.

Education 
In the region, there are high schools in Kristiansand, Lillesand, Søgne, Vennesla, and Øvrebø. In Kristiansand, there is also a cathedral high school. The University of Agder is located in Kristiansand.  There are also folk high schools such as the Agder Folkehøgskole in Søgne and NLA Mediehøgskolen Gimlekollen in Kristiansand.

See also 
Metropolitan Regions of Norway

References

External links 
 Region Kristiansand
 Statistics Norway Q3 2013

 
Metropolitan regions of Norway
Kristiansand
Lillesand
Birkenes
Vennesla
Iveland
Lindesnes